Meir "Manny" Lehman, FREng (24 January 1925 – 29 December 2010) was a professor in the School of Computing Science at Middlesex University. From 1972 to 2002 he was a Professor and Head of the Computing Department at Imperial College London. His research contributions include the early realisation of the software evolution phenomenon and the eponymous Lehman's laws of software evolution.

Career
Lehman was born in Germany on 24 January 1925 and emigrated to England in 1931. He studied mathematics as an undergraduate at Imperial College London where he was involved in the design of the Imperial College Computing Engine's Digital Computer Arithmetic Unit. He spent a year at Ferranti in London before working at Israel's Ministry of Defense from 1957 to 1964. From 1964 to 1972 he worked at IBM's research division in Yorktown Heights, NY where he studied program evolution with Les Belady. The study of IBM's programming process gave the foundations for Lehman's laws of software evolution. In 1972 he returned to Imperial College where he was Head of Section and later Head of Department (1979–1984). Lehman remained at Imperial for some thirty years until 2002 when he moved to the School of Computing Science at Middlesex University.
After retiring from Middlesex he moved to Jerusalem, Israel, where he died on 29 December 2010.

Awards and honours
 Fellow of the Royal Academy of Engineering  (1989)
 Fellow of the ACM (1994)
 Harlan D. Mills Award (2001)

References

M.M. Lehman. "Programs, life cycles, and laws of software evolution", Proceedings of the IEEE, pages 1060–1076, September 1980
Laszlo Belady, M. M. Lehman: A Model of Large Program Development. IBM Systems Journal 15(3): 225–252 (1976)

External links
FEAST Publications
IEEExplore
A unified theory of software evolution, Salon.com, 2002.

Manny Lehman's Home Page
Lehman's official academic archive

1925 births
2010 deaths
Academics of Middlesex University
Academics of the Department of Computing, Imperial College London
British computer scientists
British software engineers
Software engineering researchers